The North Iowa Cedar League (NICL) is a high school athletic conference made up of 15 high schools in north central and northeast Iowa. Most of the schools compete as 2A schools, (the second-smallest classification). The conference's most recent expansions included: Columbus Catholic (2013), Sumner-Fredericksburg (2014), and Oelwein (2021). With the addition of Oelwein in the 2021 academic year, the conference will split into three divisions: East, Central, and West.

History
The formation of the North Iowa Cedar League dates back to 1936, when the Iowa Cedar Conference (consisting of Belle Plaine, Brooklyn, Eldora, Grundy Center, Montezuma, Reinbeck, Tama, Teachers' High, Traer, & Toledo) split into the North Iowa Cedar League and South Iowa Cedar League. Founding members of the newly formed NICL include Ackley, Eldora, Grundy Center, Reinbeck, Teachers' High (NU High), and Traer.

In 1992, the Big Marsh Conference disbanded, with most of its schools joining the NICL, creating a 16 team conference. With the new members, the NICL split into two divisions, east and west. The east division included Aplington–Parkersburg, Denver, Dike–New Hartford, Gladbrook–Reinbeck, Hudson, North Tama, NU High, and Union. The west division included Ackley–Geneva, BCLUW, East Marshall, Eldora–New Providence, GMG, Grundy Center, Hubbard–Radcliffe, and Wellsburg-Steamboat Rock. In 1998, Wapsie Valley High School and Jesup High School joined the conference, bringing the membership up to 18.

In 2000, Ackley–Geneva and Wellsburg-Steamboat Rock merged districts to become AGWSR. The next membership change came in 2002 when Green Mountain–Garwin (GMG) departed for the Iowa Star Conference. The next year, North Tama left for the Iowa Star Conference. In 2007, Eldora–New Providence and Hubbard–Radcliffe joined districts to become South Hardin High School. For the 2008 year, West Marshall was added to the conference, making it a 15-team league. In 2011, South Tama joined after leaving the Little Hawkeye Conference and started in the West Division. It became the 16th member of the conference. Northern University High School (Cedar Falls) played its final season in 2011–12, due to the University of Northern Iowa closing Malcolm Price Lab, which houses Northern University High. Waterloo Columbus joined in 2013 to replace the recently defunct NU High.

With the departure of South Tama, Sumner-Fredericksburg joined in 2014 which brought the total number of schools to 16 once again. In 2020, West Marshall left the conference for the Heart of Iowa Conference. Oelwein joined soon after to replace West Marshall and a new three-division structure ensued. Starting in the 2021–22 school year, the east division will comprise Jesup, Oelwein, Sumner-Fredericksburg, Union, and Wapsie Valley, the central division will include Aplington–Parkersburg, Columbus Catholic, Denver, Dike–New Hartford, and Hudson, and the west will remain the same with AGWSR, BCLUW, East Marshall, Gladbrook–Reinbeck, Grundy Center, and South Hardin.

In 2022, BCLUW left for the Iowa Star Conference, bringing total membership to 15.

Members

Eastern Pod

Central Pod

Western Pod

Membership timeline

External links
 North Iowa Cedar League website

References

High school sports in Iowa